Temple Rodef Shalom (Reform) is the largest Jewish congregation in the Commonwealth of Virginia, located in Falls Church, Fairfax County, Virginia. Founded in 1962, it counts a membership of over 1,700 households.

In 1963, the Temple hired Laszlo Berkowits as its first rabbi. In 1998, it became one of the largest congregations in the United States to have a female rabbi, when it replaced Berkowits, who had decided to retire, with then-Associate Rabbi Amy Schwartzman.

The Temple's Associate Rabbis are Jeffrey Saxe and Stephanie Bernstein. It hired its first cantor, Michael Shochet, in 1998. Rachel Rhodes is the Associate Cantor.  Other Rabbis are Rachel Rhodes and Alexandra Stein.

Notable members and funerals
Chuck Todd
Marcus Simon

Notes

External links
Temple Rodef Shalom Official site.
Union for Reform Judaism: Temple Rodef Shalom Directory listing.

Jewish organizations established in 1962
Reform synagogues in Virginia
Buildings and structures in Falls Church, Virginia
1962 establishments in Virginia